Izzatnagar railway station is main railway station in Izzatnagar Bareilly district, Uttar Pradesh. Its code is IZN. It serves Izzatnagar city. The station consists of 4 platforms.

Izzatnagar railway division is a part of North Eastern Railway zone of Indian Railways. This railway division was founded on 14 April 1952.

Trains 

 Bandra Terminus–Ramnagar Express
 Lucknow Junction–Kathgodam Express
 Agra Fort–Ramnagar Weekly Express
 Purnagiri Jan Shatabdi Express

Gallery

References

External links 

Izzatnagar railway division
Railway stations in Bareilly